Patricio Bedrossian (born 12 April 1975) is an Argentine former professional footballer who played as a forward for clubs from Argentina, Chile, Bolivia, and Guatemala.

References
 

Living people
1975 births
Argentine footballers
Argentine sportspeople of Armenian descent
Association football forwards
Club Atlético Lanús footballers
All Boys footballers
Estudiantes de Buenos Aires footballers
Defensores de Belgrano footballers
Provincial Osorno footballers
Primera B de Chile players
Argentine Primera División players
Argentine expatriate footballers
Argentine expatriate sportspeople in Chile
Expatriate footballers in Chile
Argentine expatriate sportspeople in Bolivia
Expatriate footballers in Bolivia
Argentine expatriate sportspeople in Guatemala
Expatriate footballers in Guatemala
Sportspeople from Buenos Aires Province